Queen Mojeong was a wife of Geodeung of Geumgwan Gaya, the second king of Gaya confederacy. She gave birth of the third king, Mapum of Geumgwan Gaya. She was a daughter of Sin Po who was attendant of Heo Hwang-ok for her marriage from India. In Hwarang Segi, she was recorded as Sin Po’s daughter, but in Samgungnyusa, she was recorded as Sin Po’s wife.

Family 
Father: Sinbo (Hangul:신보)
Husband: Geodeung of Geumgwan Gaya (Hangul:거등왕)
Son: Mapum of Geumgwan Gaya (Hangul:마품왕)

References 

Royal consorts of Gaya
Korean people of Indian descent
Gaya confederacy
Year of birth unknown
Year of death unknown